Eryn Krueger Mekash is an American make-up artist, producer and special effects artist. She was nominated for an Academy Award in the category Best Makeup and Hairstyling for the film Hillbilly Elegy. Mekash has also won eight Primetime Emmy Awards and been nominated for 31 more in the category Outstanding Makeup.

Selected filmography 
 Hillbilly Elegy (2020; co-nominated with Patricia Dehaney and Matthew W. Mungle)

References

External links 

Living people
Year of birth missing (living people)
Place of birth missing (living people)
American make-up artists
Primetime Emmy Award winners
American television producers
Special effects people
21st-century American women